Egidijus Dimša (born April 1, 1985) is a Lithuanian professional basketball player for Atletas of the NKL. He plays the center position.

He signed with CBet Prienai on September 19, 2020.

References

1985 births
Living people
Basketball players from Kaunas
BC Dzūkija players
BC Lietkabelis players
BC Neptūnas players
BC Pieno žvaigždės players
Korvpalli Meistriliiga players
Lithuanian expatriate basketball people in Estonia
Lithuanian men's basketball players
Power forwards (basketball)
University of Tartu basketball team players